Allan Goldstein may refer to:

 Allan A. Goldstein (born 1949), American film director and screenwriter
 Allan L. Goldstein (born 1937), American molecular biologist